Coruscating is an album by English saxophonist John Surman recorded in 1999 and released on the ECM label.

Reception
The Allmusic review by Thom Jurek awarded the album 4½ stars, stating, "Coruscating is one of the finer moments in an already stellar career. Coruscatings mood and timbre is delicate, mysterious, and gentle, but its musical reach is muscular and wide".  

Track listing
All compositions by John Surman.

 "At Dusk" – 2:20
 "Dark Corners" – 5:01   
 "Stone Flower" – 5:53
 "Moonless Midnight" – 7:37
 "Winding Passages" – 6:49   
 "An Illusive Shadow" – 9:28   
 "Crystal Walls" – 9:53   
 "For the Moment" – 6:56

Personnel
John Surman – soprano saxophone, baritone saxophone, bass clarinet, contrabass clarinet
Chris Laurence – bassTrans4mation'''''
Rita Manning, Keith Pascoe – violins
Bill Hawkes – viola
Nick Cooper – cello

References

ECM Records albums
John Surman albums
2000 albums
Albums produced by Manfred Eicher